Surjit Singh Sethi (1928-1995) was an Indian playwright, novelist, short story writer and lyricist who wrote in Punjabi. He was also a film maker and theatre personality.

Biography 
Surjit Singh Sethi was born at Gujarkhan, Punjab Province, British India in 1928. He did his M.A. in English and submitted his thesis on Ibsenism (Dramatics) for Ph.D. He worked at All India Radio for some time as a producer. He was the founder of Speech, Drama and Music Department at Punjabi University which was later turned into the Theatre and Television Department. He groomed a number of students into stage, TV and film celebrities, and was influenced by modern trends of Western theatre. Sethi died in 1995.

Dramas 
 Parde Pichhon (Behind the Curtain), One Act Plays, 1946
 Chalde Phirde But (The Loitering Figures), One Act Plays
 Kandhi Ute Rukhda (A Tree on the Embankment), 1957
 Coffee House, 1958
 Kaccha Ghada (The Earthen Pitcher), 1960
 Kadaryar, 1960
 Bhareya Bhareya Sakhna Sakhna, 1964
 King, Mirza Te Sapera, 1965
 Gurbin Ghor Andhar (Pitch Dark Without the Guru), 1969
 Safar Baqi, Talash Baqi (The Journey Remains, The Quest Remains)
 Nangi Sarak Raat Da Ohla (The Naked Road and The Reflection of The Night), 1971
 Abara Kadabara, 1972
 Mard Mard Nahi Tiwin Tiwin Nahi (Man is Not a Man and Woman is Not a Woman)
 Eh Zindagi Hai Dosto
 Mera Murshid Mod Liao (Bring Back My Messiah), 1975
 Pebble Beach Te Laung Guacha

Novels 
 Ret Da Pahad (Mound of Sand), 1954
 Ik Shahr Di Gal (The Story of a City), 1955
 Kandhi Ute Rukhda (A Tree on The Embankment), 1957
 Ik Khali Pyala (An Empty Bowl), 1960
 Kal vi suraj nahin chadhega (The Sun Shall Not Rise Tomorrow Again), 1967
 Abra ki Adabra, 1972
 Dubde Suraj Nun Salam, 1976

Short stories 
 Angrez Angrez San (So Were The English)
 Men Kahani Da Safar (Journey of My Stories), 1972

Other books 
 Kavi Chatrik (Chatrik, The Poet) Criticism, 1955
 Natak Kala, 1974
 Langh Gaye Darya (Biography), 1976
 Shot in 12 days: The Making of Mughlani Begum

Films 
 Mughlani Begum
 Sandli

Awards and honours 
 Honoured with Prof. Piara Singh Gill & Karam Singh Sandhu Memorial Antar-Rashtari Shiromani Sahitkaar/Kalakaar Award, by the International Association of Punjabi Authors and Artists (IAPAA) in 1984.

Notes
 Primarily a playwright, he wrote short stories and novels also.
 His first full-length play, Coffee house is a portrayal of 'hollow men'.
 Kaccha Ghada and Kadaryar give new dimensions to the well-recognised figures of romances.
 King, Mirza Re Sapera and Mard Mard Nahin, Tivin Tivin Nahin are his experiments in absurd drama.
 His anthologies of one-act plays, Parde Pichhon and Chalde Phirde make a good reading.
 His early novels are Ik Shahr Di Gal, Ret Da Pahad and Kandhi Ute Rukhda, but he acquired his special place in this genre with Ik Khali Piala and Kal Vi Suraj Nahin Chadhega. In these works he employed the stream of consciousness and flashback techniques.

References 

1928 births
1995 deaths
Dramatists and playwrights from Punjab, India
Indian male dramatists and playwrights
20th-century Indian dramatists and playwrights
Academic staff of Punjabi University
20th-century Indian male writers
People from Gujar Khan